The Embassy of the United Kingdom in Moscow is the chief diplomatic mission of the United Kingdom in the Russian Federation. It is located in the Arbat District of Moscow, on Smolenskaya Embarkment of the river Moskva. The current ambassador is Deborah Bronnert CMG.

History

The Embassy site at 10 Smolenskaya Embankment, comprising 0.92 hectares, was offered to the British Government in the mid-1960s and exchanged for two sites in London by an Agreement signed in March 1987. The building contains offices for 250 Embassy staff; 31 flats for staff and facilities for their recreation and welfare, including swimming pool and cafeteria; medical centre and kindergarten; workshops and stores; and covered car parking for 85 cars. The architects of the embassy were Ahrends, Burton and Koralek (ABK) of London and Dublin. The embassy was officially opened by Anne, Princess Royal on 17 May 2000.

In 2007, a sculpture of Sherlock Holmes and Doctor Watson as portrayed by Vasily Livanov and Vitaly Solomin was erected on the embankment alongside the embassy (sculptor Andrey Orlov).

In July 2022, the city authorities renamed the territory the embassy is located in from Smolenskaya Embankment to Lugansk People's Republic Square; the embassy stated that it would continue to use the previous address.

Outside Moscow

Outside Moscow, there is one British Consulate-General in Yekaterinburg where the senior officer is known as the Consul-General.
There was a British Consulate General in St. Petersburg but it was closed in 2018 due to a diplomatic fallout following the poisoning of a former Russian intelligence officer in the United Kingdom.

See also 
 Russia-United Kingdom relations
 Consulate-General of the United Kingdom, Saint Petersburg
 Diplomatic missions in Russia

References

External links 
 British Embassy Moscow 

Russia–United Kingdom relations
Soviet Union–United Kingdom relations
United Kingdom
Moscow
Arbat District
Buildings and structures completed in 2000